The Federal Gazette (BBl; , FF; , FF; , FF) publishes various official texts of the Swiss federal government, including:

  reports of the Swiss Federal Council to the Swiss Federal Assembly, most notably the drafts of proposed laws with usually extensive explanations, 
 laws enacted by Parliament that are subject to an obligatory or facultative popular referendum,
 reports and notifications by the Federal Council, parliamentary committees and various government agencies.

It is issued in the three official languages of Switzerland: German, French and Italian. All three language editions are equally valid. It is published by the Federal Chancellery of Switzerland in the form of weekly supplements to loose leaf binders.

Since 1999, they are also made available on the internet in PDF format. Since 1 January 2016, the electronic version (and not any more the printed one) of the Official Compilation and of the Federal Gazette is deemed authentic.

See also 
 Law of Switzerland
 Official Compilation of Federal Legislation
 Systematic Compilation of Federal Legislation
 Federal Register
 Official Journal of the European Union

References

External links 
  Bundesblatt
  Feuille fédérale
  Foglio federale

Law of Switzerland
Switzerland Federal Journal